All My Love For You is a South Korean sitcom starring Kim Kap-soo, Park Mi-sun, Jo Kwon, Ga-in, Yoon Doo-joon, Jun Tae-soo and Yoon Seung-ah. It broadcast on MBC from November 8, 2010, to September 16, 2011, on Mondays to Fridays at 19:45 (KST).

Cast

Kim family
 Kim Kap-soo as Director Kim
 Park Mi-sun as Park Mi-sun
 Kim Young-ok as Kim Young-ok
 Kim Hye-ok as Kim Hye-ok/Kim Gab-sun (Ep. 120–210)
 Jo Kwon as Hwang Ok-yub
 Ga-in as Hwang Geum-ji (Ep. 1–135)
 Yoon Seung-ah as Kim Saet-byul
 Jun Tae-soo as Jeon Tae-soo (Ep. 1–60)
 Jin Yi-han as Jeon Tae-poong (Ep. 83–210)
 Jung Ho-bin as Butler Kim

Bang family
 Bang Eun-hee as Bang Eun-hee (Ep. 2–210)
 Yeon Woo-jin as Bang Woo-jin
 Yoon Doo-joon as Yoon Doo-joon (Ep. 3–210)
 Park Soo-ah as Park Soon-deok (Ep. 64, 78–210)
 Kim Na-young as Kim Na-young
 Han Young as Han Young (Ep. 67–210)

Extended cast
 Park Cho-rong as Cho-rong (Ep. 125–210)
 Choi Na-kyung as Teacher Jung (Ep. 1–86)
 Baek No-sik as President Choi
 Yoo Hyung-kwan as Director Lee
 Hong Soon-chang as Kim Gab-sub, Director Kim's cousin (Ep. 129)
 Choi Hyo-eun as Jin-ah

Cameo appearances
 Yoon Jong-shin as tutor
 Nine Muses as Director Kim's fan girls (Ep. 6)
 Nichkhun as Ok-yub's human substitute (Ep. 16)
 Park Hwi-soon as double eyelid surgery patient (Ep. 18)
 Han Sun-hwa as Geum-ji's friend (Ep. 24)
 Shindong as Geum-ji's blind date (Ep. 43-44)
 Kim Soo-yeon as Doo-joon's classmate (Ep. 70)
 Byun Ki-soo as billiards player (Ep. 72)
 Kim Shin-young as Kim Se-byul, the maid (Ep. 77)
 Leeteuk as Seung-ah's blind date (Ep. 143)
 David Oh as English teacher (Ep. 154)
 Bang Si-hyuk as audition judge (Ep. 160)
 Uee as Kim Yu-jin (ep 182, 210)
 Lee Gi-kwang as Doo-joon's rival in love (Ep. 193)
 Jo Young-min as high school student
 Jo Kwang-min as high school student
 Minwoo as high school student

Notes

References

External links
  
 

South Korean television sitcoms
MBC TV television dramas
2010 South Korean television series debuts
2011 South Korean television series endings
Korean-language television shows